Petter Steen Jr. (born 1 August 1962) is a Norwegian politician for the Conservative Party who served as the mayor of Haugesund from 2001 to 2015.

Steen was educated at Stavanger Teacher College (1986) after which he worked in the public schools in Sveio until he was elected mayor in 2001.

References

Conservative Party (Norway) politicians
Mayors of places in Rogaland
1962 births
Living people
People from Haugesund
Place of birth missing (living people)